The 2015 Portland Timbers 2 season is the inaugural season for the Portland Timbers 2 in United Soccer League (USL), the third-division professional soccer league in the United States and Canada. The Timbers 2 are the reserve team of the MLS side, Portland Timbers.

Background

Competitions

United Soccer League

Preseason

USL regular season

USL Playoffs

Standings

U.S. Open Cup

Cascadia 2 Cup

Friendlies

Club

Kits

Executive staff

Coaching staff

Squad

Roster

Appearances and goals

|-
! colspan="12" style="background:#228B22; color:#FFDF00; text-align:center"| Goalkeepers

|-
! colspan="12" style="background:#228B22; color:#FFDF00; text-align:center"| Defenders

|-
! colspan="12" style="background:#228B22; color:#FFDF00; text-align:center"| Midfielders

|-
! colspan="12" style="background:#228B22; color:#FFDF00; text-align:center"| Forwards

Goalkeeper stats

Player movement

Transfers in

Loans in

Loans out

Transfers out

See also 
 2015 Portland Timbers season
 2015 USL season

References 

 

2015
Portland Timbers 2
Portland Timbers 2
Portland Timbers 2
Portland